The Supreme Soviet of the Kirghiz SSR was the supreme soviet (legislative branch) of the Kirghiz Soviet Socialist Republic, which was a constituent republics of the Soviet Union. The Soviet was purely ceremonial as power was concentrated in the Communist Party of Kirghizia (CPK).

Convocations
1st convocation (1938–1946)
2nd convocation (1946–1950)
3rd convocation (1950–1954)
4th convocation (1954–1958)
5th convocation (1958–1962)
6th convocation (1962–1966)
7th convocation (1966–1971)
8th convocation (1971–1975)
9th convocation (1975–1979)
10th convocation (1979–1984)
11th convocation (1984–1989)
12th convocation (1989–1993)

Leaders

Chairmen of the Supreme Soviet

Chairmen of the Presidium of the Supreme Soviet 
The office of Chairmen of the Presidium of the Supreme Soviet functioned as the executive head of state of the Republic.

 Asanali Tolubaev (July 19, 1938 – March 22, 1943)
 Moldogazy Tokobayev (March 22, 1943 – November 14, 1945)
 Turabay Kulatov (November 14, 1945 – August 25, 1978)
 Sultan Ibraimov (August 25, 1978 – December 22, 1978)
 Andrei Buss (December 22, 1978 – January 10, 1979)
 Arstanbek Duisheev (January 10, 1979 – January 14, 1981)
 Temirbek Koshoev (January 14, 1981 – August 8, 1987)
Tashtanbek Akmatov (August 8, 1987 – April 10, 1990)

Notable members

Notable members included:

Myktybek Abdyldayev, former Prosecutor General of Kyrgyzstan
Askar Akayev, President of Kyrgyzstan
Anvar Artykov, former Governor of Osh Region
Apas Jumagulov, President of the Council of Ministers of Kirghiz SSR
Absamat Masaliyev, First Secretary of the Central Committee of the Communist Party of Kirghizia
Kakish Ryskulova, first woman surgeon in Kyrgyzstan

References 

1937 establishments in the Soviet Union
1994 disestablishments in Kyrgyzstan
Kirghiz Soviet Socialist Republic
Defunct unicameral legislatures
Kirghiz